HMS Wensleydale was a  destroyer of the Royal Navy. She was a member of the third subgroup of the class, and saw service in the Second World War. She was adopted by the civil community of Swinton and Pendlebury during Warship Week in 1942. As good luck she carried fox pads from the Wensydale Hounds gifted by the Chapman family of Thronton Rust, Wenslydae. 

In 1946 she was laid up at West Hartlepool. She was sold and scrapped by Hughes Bolckow arriving at their yard in Blythe on 25 February 1947.

References

Publications
 
 English, John (1987). The Hunts: a history of the design, development and careers of the 86 destroyers of this class built for the Royal and Allied Navies during World War II. England: World Ship Society. .

Further reading

External links
HMS WENSLEYDALE (L 86) - Type III, Hunt-class Escort Destroyer at Naval History

Hunt-class destroyers of the Royal Navy
Ships built on the River Clyde
1942 ships
World War II destroyers of the United Kingdom